The 2010 Trinidad and Tobago Goal Shield was the second edition of the annual Lucozade Sport Goal Shield, which is a knockout tournament competition for teams in the TT Pro League. W Connection entered as the defending champions after they defeated Defence Force 3–0 in the inaugural tournament. Continuing from the previous season, the competition not only allowed the winner and runner-up healthy purses at the end of the tournament, but more so give an added incentive for more goals to be scored throughout the tournament. In particular, the winner of the competition was awarded TT$20,000 plus an additional TT$3,000 for every goal scored in the final, TT$2,000 for every goal in the semifinals, and TT$1,000 for each goal scored in the quarterfinals. Whereas, the runner-up was awarded TT$10,000 plus TT$1,500 for every goal scored in the final, TT$1,000 for every goal in the semifinals, and TT$500 for each goal scored in the quarterfinals.

Due to the refurbishment of Trinidad and Tobago's five major stadiums, ahead of the 2010 FIFA U-17 Women's World Cup, all of the matches were played at Marvin Lee Stadium in Macoya.

Qualification
Seeding was determined from the league standings following the conclusion of the first round of matches in the 2010–11 season. The bottom two teams were placed in a penalty shootout to determine which team would advance to the qualifying round. Teams ranked seventh to ninth were then placed directly into the qualifying round which will determine the seventh and eight spots in the quarterfinals. Finally, the teams ranked from first to sixth automatically qualified for the quarterfinals.

The automatic quarterfinal qualifiers in order of league position were: Defence Force, Joe Public, W Connection, Ma Pau, San Juan Jabloteh, and Caledonia AIA.

Schedule
The schedule for the 2010 Lucozade Sport Goal Shield, as announced by the TT Pro League:

Bracket

Results
All matches except the Penalty shootout were played for 90 minutes duration, at the end of which if the match was still tied, penalty-kicks were used to determine the match winner.

Penalty shootout
The tournament commenced on 23 July with FC South End defeating Police 5–3 in a penalty shootout to determine the tenth team to enter the competition.

Qualifying round
In the qualifying round, North East Stars took an early lead over FC South End with a strike from Sean Fraser and eased into the quarterfinals by a 3–0 score. In the other fixture, St. Ann's Rangers and Tobago United needed 16 penalty kicks to determine the winner after the match ended scoreless. Tobago United's goalkeeper, Sean Johnson, provided some brilliant saves during regulation time before pulling off a save against Joseph Peters in the fifth kick of the penalty shootout to help his side win 6–5 from the spot.

Quarterfinals
In the quarterfinals, Devorn Jorsling completed a beaver-trick to help Defence Force advance with a 5–3 victory over Tobago United. Joe Public were knocked out of the tournament following a 2–0 loss to North East Stars. In addition, San Juan Jabloteh advanced to the semifinals after they defeated Ma Pau on penalties 4–2 after the match ended 1–1. The last team to secure their place was W Connection who defeated Caledonia AIA 1–0.

Semifinals
On 6 August, Defence Force suffered their first defeat of the league season following their loss to San Juan Jabloteh 0–1. In the other semifinal, North East Stars upended the defending champions W Connection by a 2–1 score.

Final
On 13 August, North East Stars captured the title with the lone goal supplied by Sean Fraser in the 1–0 win over San Juan Jabloteh at Marvin Lee Stadium in Macoya.

References

External links
Official Website

2010 Lucozade Sport Goal Shield
Trinidad and Tobago Goal Shield
Goal Shield